The Gates is an American supernatural crime drama television series that aired on the ABC network from June 20, 2010 to September 19, 2010.  The show was cancelled after its first season due to low ratings.

Plot
Nick Monahan and his family move from Chicago to a serene, upscale community called The Gates, where he has a job as the new chief of police. They soon realise that the community is unlike any other, consisting of mysterious neighbors who are not what they appear to be.

Cast and characters
Frank Grillo as Nick Monohan, the Gates’ new chief of police.
Marisol Nichols as Sarah Monohan, his wife.
Travis Caldwell as Charlie Monohan, his son.
McKaley Miller as Dana Monohan, his daughter.
Luke Mably as Dylan Radcliff, a vampire.
Rhona Mitra as Claire Radcliff, a vampire and Dylan's wife.
Chandra West as Devon Buckley, the series' main antagonist and a witch.
Victoria Platt as Dr. Peg Mueller, Devon's nemesis, as well as a witch.
Skyler Samuels as Andie Bates, a succubus and both Charlie and Brett's love interest.
Colton Haynes as Brett Crezki, Andie's ex-boyfriend and a werewolf.
Justin Miles as Marcus Jordan, a deputy officer alongside Leigh Turner and Nick Monahan.
Janina Gavankar as Leigh Turner, a deputy officer alongside Marcus Jordan and Nick Monahan. Her species is unknown, presumed the "living dead" as her heart was ripped out by an ex-boyfriend.
James Preston as Lukas Ford, a werewolf and leader of his own small pack of teenage werewolves.

Development and production
In January 2009, The Gates was among numerous pilot scripts being considered by ABC for the 2009–2010 season.  It was not until October 2009 that ABC first announced development of the series, which is an international co-production for Fox Television Studios through their international paradigm.  A green-light for the 13 episode order was contingent on international financing for the project, which makes the series more economically feasible as a summer replacement.

Casting began in January 2010.  In early February,  casting announcements included Frank Grillo in a lead role, as well as Luke Mably, Janina Gavankar, and Chandra West having joined the cast. Late March 2010 castings included Marisol Nichols and Rhona Mitra in leading roles.  Victoria Platt, Skyler Samuels and newcomer Justin Miles were also cast in the project. Paul Blackthorne will appear in a recurring role.

Filming began in Shreveport, Louisiana on March 29, 2010, and was expected to continue until August 2010. Original reports by Variety suggested that the series might be filmed overseas, with another outlet mentioning South America. The show has featured music by a variety of artists, including indie folk songwriter Quinn Marston.

Cancellation
Soon after the first season finished airing there were rumors that the show would not be returning for a second season. These rumors were further fueled by cast member Grillo's tweets suggesting that his contract was not going to be renewed. In October 2010 several of the show's stars confirmed that the show had indeed been canceled and that there would not be a second season.

Episodes

U.S. Nielsen ratings

See also
List of vampire television series
Werewolf fiction

References

External links

2010 American television series debuts
2010 American television series endings
American Broadcasting Company original programming
2010s American crime drama television series
2010s American horror television series
2010s American mystery television series
2010s American supernatural television series
American fantasy television series
English-language television shows
Television series by 20th Century Fox Television
Television shows set in Louisiana
American thriller television series
Vampires in television
Television about werewolves
Witchcraft in television
Television series about vampires
American fantasy drama television series